Les Grands Ducs (English: The Big Dukes) is a 1996 comedy film directed by Patrice Leconte, starring Jean-Pierre Marielle, Philippe Noiret, Jean Rochefort and Catherine Jacob.

Plot
George Cox, Victor Vialat and Eddie Carpentier are old and shabby broke actors. They will resume unexpectedly with panache but three small roles in a light comedy, bound for a tour. Shapiron, producer, ruined, will do anything to sabotage the show and thus get the insurance but the three actors will not let the last chance of life.

Cast
 Jean-Pierre Marielle as George Cox
 Philippe Noiret as Victor Vialat
 Jean Rochefort as Eddie Carpentier
 Catherine Jacob as Carla Milo
 Michel Blanc as Shapiron
 Clotilde Courau as Juliette
 Jacques Mathou as Janvier
 Pierre-Arnaud Juin as Pat
 Jacques Nolot as Francis Marceau
 Albert Delpy as Harry
 Marie Pillet as Clémence
 Jean-Marie Galey as Markus
 Dominique Besnehard as Atlas's Boss

References

External links

1996 films
1996 comedy films
Films directed by Patrice Leconte
French comedy films
1990s French-language films
1990s French films